The (Northern) Sporades are an archipelago along the east coast of Greece, northeast of the island of Euboea, in the Aegean Sea. They consist of 24 islands, four of which are permanently inhabited: Alonnisos, Skiathos, Skopelos and Skyros. They may also be referred to as the Thessalian Sporades.

Etymology
"Sporades" means "those scattered" (compare with "sporadic"). From Classical Antiquity the name has referred to the Aegean island groups outside the central archipelago of the Cyclades.

Geography
In modern geographical parlance, there are five different Sporades groups:
 Thessalian Sporades or Northern Sporades. Since  1960, the term "Sporades" refers mainly to these islands:
Skopelos
 Alonnisos
 Skiathos
 Skyros
 Kyra Panagia
 Peristera
 Gioura
 Skantzoura
 Piperi
 Tsougria
 Thracian Sporades: Thasos, Samothrace, Imbros, Lemnos and Agios Efstratios
 Western Sporades: Salamis, Aigina, Poros, Hydra, Spetses, and the other islands of the Saronic Gulf and the Myrtoan Sea.
 Eastern Sporades, i.e. the islands of the eastern and northeastern Aegean, near the coast of Asia Minor: Samos, Ikaria, Lesbos, Chios, Tenedos, Psara, Oinousses and smaller island groups
 Southern Sporades, i.e. the Dodecanese, to which group Samos and Ikaria are sometimes appended.

Administration

As a part of the 2011 Kallikratis government reform, the Sporades Regional Unit was created out of part of the former Magnesia Prefecture, region of Thessaly. The regional unit is subdivided into 3 municipalities. These are:

Skiathos (1)
Skopelos (3)
Alonnisos (2)

The island of Skyros with a few uninhabited islets in its area are part of the Euboea regional unit and the administrative region of Central Greece.

See also
List of islands of Greece

References

Sources
 "Skyros – Britannica Concise" (description), Britannica Concise, 2006, webpage: EB-Skyros.

External links

 Skiathos Villas  
 Sporades The Official website of the Greek National Tourism Organisation
 Skopelos island Travel Guide since 1999
 Alonnisos island Travel Guide

 
Archipelagoes of Greece
Landforms of Thessaly
Aegean islands

tr:Ege Adaları#Eğriboz ve Şeytan Adaları (Kuzey Sporatlar, Tesalya Adaları)